At least two ships of the French Navy have been named Simoun:

 , a  launched in 1902.
 , a  launched in 1924 and scrapped in 1950.

French Navy ship names